Tsachev is a Bulgarian masculine surname, its feminine counterpart is Tsacheva. Notable people with the surname include:

Ivan Tsachev (born 1989), Bulgarian footballer
Tsetska Tsacheva (born 1958), Bulgarian jurist and politician

Bulgarian-language surnames